Duo 5 (formerly known as Kanal 12 (literal English translation Channel 12)) is an Estonian TV channel. It is owned by the Kanal 2 company. Duo 5 is owned by Duo Media Networks.

Shows

Kanal 12 shows mainly reality shows and serials.
Baywatch (Rannavalve)
Formula Renault 3.5 Series live broadcast
MacGyver
Married... with Children (Tuvikesed)
Walker, Texas Ranger (Walker, Texase korravalvur)
WWE Raw
WWE Smackdown
Rude Tube (Klikitähed)
Dudesons (Duudsonid)
Most Shocking (20 kõige shokeerivamat)
Most Daring (Hulljulged)
Extreme Fishing with Robson Green (Ekstreemkalapüük Robson Greeniga)
Jail (Vangla)
The Hungry Sailors (Näljased meremehed)
Sports Gone Wild (Pöörased spordiklipid)
Travel Sick (Kreisid reisid)
All About Men (Kogu tõde meestest)
Piers Morgan On... (Piers Morgani luksusreisid)
Conan (talk show)
Kommissar Rex
Cops (Võmmid)SEAL TeamMagnum, P.I. (Eradetektiiv Magnum)''

References

External links

Television channels in Estonia
Television channels and stations established in 2011
2011 establishments in Estonia
Mass media in Tallinn